The Groupes mobiles de réserve, often referred to as GMR, were paramilitary gendarmerie units created by the Vichy regime during the Second World War. Their development was the special task of René Bousquet, Vichy director-general of the French national police.

History 

The GMR were conceived at the time as a prefiguration of the renewal of the Vichy French Army, limited to 100,000 men by the armistice with Germany, and as a force to maintain order along the lines of the Gendarmerie mobile. Since they were affiliated with the national police, they did not have military status, thereby formally respecting the terms of the armistice.

The numbers of the Garde mobile had been reduced along with the army by the exigencies of the armistice. Accordingly a law was passed on 23 April 1941 to tackle the maintenance of order, mandating the creation of the GMR. According to a subsequent decree of 7 July they would be attached to the regional public security forces and answerable to the police intendent (a position established by the law of 19 April 1941) under the authority of the regional prefect. These police units were assembled in the zone libre from autumn 1941 onwards, and deployed throughout occupied France by the end of 1942. The law of 17 April established centrally a leadership of the GMT, and, regionally, area instructions. This civil paramilitary force was original envisaged to maintain order in an urban setting. However, from autumn 1943, it was involved in operations against the French Resistance, in which it often proved much more zealous than the Garde mobile.

A GMR, led by a commandant (from a guardian of the peace), comprised at most 220 officers, and was divided into four sections commanded mainly by officers of the peace and themselves divided into four brigades.

From autumn 1943 onwards, the GMR took part in offensives launched by the Vichy government against maquis formations, with the consent of the Germans. They fought in the Massif Central and took part as an auxiliary force in the fighting against the Glières Maquis. During operations against the Maquis du Vercors, the GMR stationed themselves at the foot of the massif to prevent access. The main responsibility for larger-scale military actions fell on the German army with secondary participation by the Milice.

In contrast to the departmental police, the GMR were not recruited from the heart of the local population. They thus had no reason to seek the same type of modus vivendi which often existed between the maquis fighters and local law enforcement. Insofar as can be judged from witnesses and historians, they did not show particular scruples during these campaigns of repression, even taking into account defections among them in the summer of 1944.

After the liberation on 8 December 1944, the GMR were dissolved, and a part of them were merged, after épuration (purging of collaborators), with elements from the French Forces of the Interior to create the Compagnies républicaines de sécurité (CRS).

Ranks
GMR was a branch of the Vichy National Police and wore its uniforms and rank insignia.

References

Bibliography 
 Alain Pinel, Une police de Vichy – Les Groupes Mobiles de Réserve, (1941-1944), Préface by Philippe Braud, L'Harmattan, coll. Sécurité et société, Paris, 2004.
 Alain Pinel, Histoire de la Police, du Moyen Âge à nos jours, Robert Laffont, coll. Bouquins, 2005, pp. 703–707.
 Stephen M. Cullen, Mark Stacey, World War II Vichy French Security Troops, Osprey Publishing, 2018.
 Yves Mathieu, Policiers perdus - Les GMR dans la Seconde Guerre mondiale, Messages SAS, Toulouse, 2009.

External links
  Website on the Polices Mobiles (GMR, FRS, CRS)
   Histoire de l'institution, GMR document from the Government Archives

Vichy France
1944 disestablishments in France
Defunct law enforcement agencies of France